The Adolescence of Time is a Big Finish Productions audio drama featuring Lisa Bowerman as Bernice Summerfield, a character from the spin-off media based on the long-running British science fiction television series Doctor Who.

Plot 
Bernice and Peter find themselves on Earth... after events have started to lead to the extinction of the dinosaurs.

Cast
Bernice Summerfield - Lisa Bowerman
Peter Summerfield - Thomas Grant
Celethua - Lois Baxter
Tektekachuan - Tim Block
Ixotta - Emily Pithon

External links
Big Finish Productions - Professor Bernice Summerfield: The Adolescence of Time

Bernice Summerfield audio plays
Works by Lawrence Miles
Fiction set in the 27th century